UN Web TV (formerly United Nations Television, also known as UNTV), is the public affairs television arm of the United Nations. It broadcasts live and recorded gavel-to-gavel meetings of various United Nations agencies and arms from around the world, including the General Assembly and the Security Council. It is part of the News and Media Division of the United Nations Department of Global Communications.

In addition, three series are produced and broadcast on UNTV: 
 21st Century
 UN in Action
 Year in Review

External links
 UN Web TV
 UN Multimedia

United Nations mass media
Legislature broadcasters